This is a list of beaches in Taiwan.

Beaches in Taiwan

Main island
 Baisha Bay, New Taipei
 Fulong Beach, New Taipei
 Green Bay, New Taipei
 Honeymoon Bay, Yilan County
 Manzhou Beach, Pingtung County
 Neipi Beach, Yilan County
 Qixingtan Beach, Hualien County
 Sanxiantai, Taitung County
 Sizihwan, Kaohsiung
 South Bay, Pingtung County
 Yanliao Beach Park, New Taipei
  Hengchun Beach
 Kenting National Park Beach

External islands
 Mysterious Little Bay, Lienchiang County

Gallery

See also
 List of beaches

References

 
Taiwan
Beaches
Beaches
Beaches